Skinner's Baby is a 1917 American silent comedy film starring Bryant Washburn, Hazel Daly, James C. Carroll, and U.K. Haupt. This film projected Washburn out of obscurity; it was quite a success.  It was Jackie Coogan's first film role, as the baby, though uncredited.  The film is believed to be lost.

It was released on August 6, 1917, and loosely based on the story by Henry Irving Dodge.  The movie was the third of a Skinner series for Washburn, with Skinner's Dress Suit coming first in January 1917, followed by Skinner's Bubble and Skinner's Baby, all in the same year.

Motography wrote that while the film "lacks the plot material of the earlier releases, it contains enough of human interest to 'get by' easily with most audiences."  Variety concluded that it was "a sweet wholesome picture with little touches of sentiment interwoven that tug at the heart strings, a feature that provides clean, pleasurable entertainment."

Cast
Bryant Washburn as William Manning Skinner
Hazel Daly as Honey
James C. Carroll as McLaughlin
U.K. Haupt as Perkins
Jackie Coogan as the baby (uncredited)

References

External links
 
 

1918 films
1917 comedy films
1917 films
American black-and-white films
Films directed by Harry Beaumont
Essanay Studios films
Lost American films
American silent feature films
Silent American comedy films
1918 comedy films
1918 lost films
1910s American films
1910s English-language films